The 2018 Beach Soccer Intercontinental Cup, also known as the Huawei Beach Soccer Intercontinental Cup Dubai 2018 for sponsorship reasons, was the eighth edition of the Beach Soccer Intercontinental Cup, an annual international beach soccer tournament contested by men's national teams.

Held in Dubai, United Arab Emirates since its inception, this year's event occurred between 6 and 10 November. The tournament was organised by the Dubai Sports Council (DSC) and Beach Soccer Worldwide (BSWW).

After the FIFA Beach Soccer World Cup, the Intercontinental Cup is the biggest tournament in the current international beach soccer calendar. Similar to the FIFA Confederations Cup, eight nations will take part, with one team representing each of the six continental football confederations as well as the current World Cup champions, Brazil, and the hosts, the United Arab Emirates.

The tournament started with a round robin group stage. The winners and runners-up from each group advanced to the knockout stage, a series of single-elimination matches, beginning with the semi-finals and ending with the final. Consolation matches were also played to determine other final rankings.

The season-ending Beach Soccer Stars awards were also presented in Dubai as a conclusion to the tournament.

Brazil were the defending champions but lost to Russia in the semi-finals, ultimately finishing third; the defeat ended a 66-game winning streak for Canarinhos, their last loss dating back to the 2015 World Cup (also against Russia). Iran beat Russia in the final to claim their second Intercontinental Cup crown.

Participating teams
The following eight teams took part including the hosts, current World Cup winners and one of the best performing nations from each of the six regional championships hosted by the confederations of FIFA. However, CONMEBOL did not enter a regional performer this year, so UEFA entered two teams.

Overall, Europe and Asia were represented by two nations; Africa, South America, North America and Oceania, one nation each.

1. Qualified as hosts, but also achieved a 2017 AFC Beach Soccer Championship runners-up finish

Venue
The tournament took place in a new part of Dubai for the second consecutive year; this edition is held at an arena on Kite Beach, Jumeirah 3, with a capacity of 3,500.

Speaking at the draw event, BSWW Vice-president Joan Cusco was welcoming of the change of location back to a beach venue saying, "this is where we belong". (The previous edition was held in an inland area of Dubai for the first time). On the change of venue, DSC General Secretary Saeed Hareb stated the Council was in the process of finding a permanent home for the Intercontinental Cup.

Sponsors
The following were the official sponsors of the tournament:

Huawei (lead sponsors)
Audi
Emirates
RAKBANK
Continental

Vitamin Well
Mycujoo
Aquafina
Pocari Sweat

Draw
The draw to split the eight teams into two groups of four took place on 10 October at the Dubai Sports Council headquarters at 11:00 GST (UTC+4).

For the purposes of the draw, the nations were divided into fours sets, Pots 1–4, shown in the table below. From each pot, the first team drawn out was placed into Group A; the other team was drawn into Group B. The teams were allocated to specific positions in their respective groups via the drawing of balls from a further two pots; for the teams entering Group A, Pot A, which contained the positions A1–A4 and for the teams entering Group B, Pot B, containing the positions B1–B4.

The hosts, the United Arab Emirates, were automatically allocated to position A1.

Note: The numbers in parentheses show the world ranking of the teams at the time of the draw.

Group stage
Matches are listed as local time in Dubai, GST (UTC+4)

Group A

Group B

5th–8th place play-offs
The teams finishing in third and fourth place were knocked out of title-winning contention, receding to play in consolation matches to determine 5th through 8th place in the final standings.

5th to 8th place semi-finals

Seventh place play-off

Fifth place play-off

Knockout stage
The group winners and runners-up progressed to the knockout stage to continue to compete for the title.

Semi finals

Third place play-off

Final

Awards

Winners trophy

Individual awards

Statistics

Goalscorers

9 goals
 Fedor Zemskov

8 goals
 Rodrigo

7 goals
 Artur Paporotnyi

6 goals

 Moustafa Aly Mohamed 
 Bruno Xavier
 Mohammad Masoumizadeh
 Eduard Suarez

5 goals

 Llorenç Gomez
 Heiarii Tavanae
 Ahmed Beshr
 Tearii Labaste
 Raimana Li Fung Kuee
 Nick Perera

4 goals

 Mohamed Abdelnaby
 Igor Melo
 Filipe Silva
 Tomas Canale
 Gabriel Silveira
 Javi Torres

3 goals

 Boris Nikonorov
 Amirhosein Akbari 
 Christopher Albiston
 Hamid Behzadpour
 Ahmed Elshahat
 Mauricinho
 Datinha
 Mostafa Kiani
 Ali Mohammadi
 Kirill Romanov
 Taiarui Heimanu

2 goals

 David Adril 
 Moustafa Samir
 Ali Karim
 Hasham Almuntaser
 Rafinha
 Haitham Atef
 Waleed Beshr
 Adrian Frutos
 Fernando Guisado
 Yury Krasheninnikov
 Ali Mirshekari
 David Mondragon
 Mohammad Moradi 
 Walid Mohammadi
 Mohamed Hassane

1 goal

 Mohammed Ahmadzadeh
 Franck Revel
 Domingo Cabrera
 Andrei Novikov
 Ariihau Teriitau
 Abbas Ali
 Salvador "Chiky" Ardil 
 Mao
 Bokinha
 Teva Zaveroni
 Aleksey Makarov
 Moslem Mesigar
 Saeid Piramoun
 Christopher Toth
 Antonio Farias 
 Salem Heirauarii
 Jose Cintas
 Maxim Chuzhkov
 Dmitry Shishin
 Anton Shkarin

Own goals

 Ahmed Beshr (vs. Brazil)

Source

Final standings

References

External links
Intercontinental Beach Soccer Cup Dubai 2018, at Beach Soccer Worldwide
Intercontinental Cup 2018, at Beach Soccer Russia (in Russian)

Beach Soccer Intercontinental Cup
Beach Soccer Intercontinental Cup
International association football competitions hosted by the United Arab Emirates
Intercontinental Cup
Beach Soccer Intercontinental Cup